The Fujifilm FinePix S2 Pro is an interchangeable lens digital single-lens reflex camera introduced in January 2002. It is based on a Nikon F80 (N80 in the U.S.) film camera body that was modified by Fujifilm to include its own proprietary image sensor and electronics. Because of the Nikon body, it has a Nikon AF lens mount and so can use most lenses made for Nikon 35 mm cameras. It is autofocusing, with an electronically controlled focal plane shutter with speeds from 30 sec. to 1/4000 sec., built-in exposure metering and pop-up flash. Its ISO film speed equivalents range from 100 - 1600.  The S2 Pro also has sound recording capability. The camera is no longer in production, having been superseded by the Fujifilm FinePix S3 Pro in February 2004.

Aside from the Nikon lens mount, the camera's principal distinction is its 6.17 megapixel photo sensor. Known as the Super CCD, it is unique in having its photodiodes oriented diagonally rather than horizontally and vertically as in all other DSLR cameras. This allows the use of a sophisticated interpolation system that produces an output image equivalent to 12.1 megapixels. The apparent resolution of images in this interpolated mode lies somewhere between 6.17 megapixels and the 12.1 megapixel interpolated output.

A huge number of these cameras were built using a Sony sourced defective CCD that was subject to a recall by Fuji. The recall ended when the stock of these replacement CCD's was depleted. There is word that no other stockpiles exist of this Super HAD CCD, making these cameras that are found with the purple or black tinted image problems extinct, only usable for parts. The Fuji F700 used a similar defective HAD CCD, but in 3.1/6.2Mp size. That camera has met a similar fate.

References 

S2